Lyonia jamaicensis is a species of plant in the family Ericaceae. It is endemic to Jamaica.

References

Flora of Jamaica
jamaicensis
Near threatened plants
Endemic flora of Jamaica
Taxonomy articles created by Polbot